is a song recorded by Japanese singer Aya Matsuura for her debut studio album, First Kiss. It was released as the album's third single on September 5, 2001, through Zetima.

Background
Matsuura performed "Love Namidairo" on her first appearance on Kōhaku Uta Gassen in 2001 on which she was the first act to perform. "Love Namidairo" was the official song performed by contestants at the Morning Musume. 5th Generation auditions. In 2002, an English-language cover, dubbed "Love Letter", was recorded by Louise Redknapp for the album Cover Morning Musume Hello! Project!. Matsuura also re-recorded the song in 2006 for her album Naked Songs. This album included arrangements with a studio brass section and more acoustic rhythm section.

Chart performance
"Love Namidairo" debuted at number 3 on the Oricon Singles Chart, with 75,000 copies sold in its first week. The single dropped to number 7 on its second week, selling 34,000 copies. It next spent a last week in the top ten, at number 10, logging sales of 23,000 copies. The single charted in the top 100 for nine weeks, selling a reported total of 172,000 units.

Track listing

Charts

Certification and sales

Cover versions
 You Kikkawa covered the song on her 2012 cover album Vocalist?.

References

External links
 Love Namidairo on the Up-Front Works official website

2001 songs
2001 singles
Aya Matsuura songs
Japanese synth-pop songs
Songs about heartache
Synth-pop ballads
2000s ballads
Songs written by Tsunku
Song recordings produced by Tsunku
Zetima Records singles